Francis Vernon, 1st Earl of Shipbrook (1715 – 15 October 1783), known as The Lord Orwell between 1762 and 1776 and as The Viscount Orwell between 1776 and 1777, was an English politician.

Vernon was the son of James Vernon by his wife Arethusa, daughter of Charles Boyle, Lord Clifford. Vernon sat as Member of Parliament for Ipswich from 1762 to 1768. In 1762 he was raised to the Peerage of Ireland as Baron Orwell, of Newry in the County of Down. He was further honoured when he was made Viscount Orwell in 1776 and in 1777 Earl of Shipbrooke "of Newry in the County of Down", also in the Irish peerage. Shipbrook Castle in Cheshire was the earliest recorded seat of the Vernon family.

He married Alice, daughter of Samuel Ibbetson of Denton Hall, Wharfedale, Yorkshire. Their son, Francis (1752–1760) died early.

Lord Shipbrooke died in October 1783 when all the titles became extinct.

References

Members of the Parliament of Great Britain for Ipswich
1715 births
1783 deaths
Earls in the Peerage of Ireland
Peers of Ireland created by George III
British MPs 1761–1768